Ludwig Satz (18 February 1891 – 31 August 1944) was an actor in Yiddish theater and film, best known for his comic roles. A 1925 New York Times article singles him out as the greatest Yiddish comic actor of the time.

He was born in Lemberg (Lwów), Austria-Hungary (now Lviv, Ukraine). At the age of 18 he formed his own theater company in Galicia; he emigrated to the U.S. in 1912.

Satz played the male lead in the 1931 film His Wife's Lover (Zayn Vaybs Lubovnik), which was billed as the "first Jewish musical comedy talking picture". He also played on Broadway, one of his more noted roles being Abe Potash in the 1926 Potash and Perlmuter of A. H. Woods.

He starred in A Galitsianer Khasene (A wedding in Galitsia) (music by Herman Wohl, lyrics Boris Rozenthal) with Zina Goldstein and in Ven di zun geyt oyf (Sunrise) with Ola Lilith. His last role was in The Golden Land at the Public Theatre in 1943.

He died in New York City in 1944 survived by his widow, Lillie; three daughters (Celia, Mimi, and Frances); two brothers, Alexander and Eli, "an actor known professionally as Eli Mintz."

Notes

External links
 
Papers of Ludwig Satz.; P-844; American Jewish Historical Society, Boston, MA and New York, NY.

1891 births
1944 deaths
American people of Ukrainian-Jewish descent
Jewish American male actors
Ukrainian Jews
Yiddish theatre performers
Yiddish-language singers
20th-century American male singers
20th-century American singers
Austro-Hungarian emigrants to the United States